Kansas's 34th Senate district is one of 40 districts in the Kansas Senate. It has been represented by Republican Ed Berger since 2017; Berger was defeated in the 2020 Republican primary by Mark Steffen.

Geography
District 34 covers all of Reno County and parts of Kingman County to the west of Wichita, including the communities of Hutchinson, Kingman, South Hutchinson, Buhler, Haven, and Nickerson.

The district is located largely within Kansas's 1st congressional district, with a small part extending into the 4th district. It overlaps with the 101st, 102nd, 104th, and 114th districts of the Kansas House of Representatives.

Recent election results

2020

2016

2012

Federal and statewide results in District 34

References

34
Kingman County, Kansas
Reno County, Kansas